Challeghatta is an upcoming metro station in Bangalore, India. It will be the western terminal metro station on the east-west corridor of the Purple Line of Namma Metro. It will be a 1.30 km extension from Kengeri metro station, which is to be commissioned around June 2023.

Station Layout 
Station Layout - To Be Confirmed

Entry/Exit

See also 

 Bangalore
 List of Namma Metro stations
 Transport in Karnataka
 List of metro systems
 List of rapid transit systems in India
 Bangalore Metropolitan Transport Corporation

References 

Namma Metro stations